Deon van der Walt (28 July 1958 – 29 November 2005), was a South African tenor.

Van der Walt studied singing at Stellenbosch University and made his debut as Jaquino in Beethoven's Fidelio at the Cape Town Opera before he had graduated. Numerous scholarships and awards allowed him to continue his studies abroad. His first formal engagement took him to Gelsenkirchen's Musiktheater im Revier, then to the Staatsoper Stuttgart and Zurich Opera. He was invited to perform at the Royal Opera House in London in 1985 and there made his debut as Almaviva in Rossini's The Barber of Seville.

He was counted amongst the leading lyric tenors of his day and performed at all the world's major opera houses, including
La Scala in Milan
the Hamburg State Opera
the Vienna State Opera
the Bavarian State Opera in Munich
the Zurich Opera, Switzerland
the Liceu in Barcelona
the Metropolitan Opera in New York

He also performed at numerous international festivals, especially at the Salzburg Festival, where he sang Belmonte in Mozart's Abduction from the Seraglio and Ferrando in Così fan tutte under Riccardo Muti.

On video, he can be seen in Handel's Semele as Jupiter, singing a long, beautifully shaped "Where'er you walk"; in Donizetti's Linda di Chamounix with Edita Gruberová; and in La belle Hélène.

Deon van der Walt died at 47 on his family's vineyard in South Africa, shot by his father, who then committed suicide.

References

1958 births
2005 deaths
South African operatic tenors
Afrikaner people
South African murder victims
People murdered in South Africa
Deaths by firearm in South Africa
Stellenbosch University alumni
20th-century South African male opera singers
21st-century South African male opera singers